Sitnica is a village in the municipality of Ribnik, Republika Srpska, Bosnia and Herzegovina. As of 2013, the village had a population of 218 inhabitants.

Notable people
Uroš Drenović (1911–1944), military commander

References

Populated places in Ribnik
Villages in Republika Srpska